The Thumb is a mountain located  south of Sitchiada Mountain on the east side of Bear Lake, on the divide between the upper Omineca River and the basin of the Bear River in the Omineca Country of the Central-North Interior of British Columbia, Canada.  As the Omineca is part of the Arctic Ocean drainage, via the Peace and Mackenzie Rivers, and the Bear is in the basin of the Skeena River, which drains to the Pacific, The Thumb is located on the Continental Divide.

Geology
The Thumb is the largest in a cluster of roughly seven volcanic plugs. They are surrounded by the remains of eroded cinder cones, lava flows and dikes. Even though the plugs have not been dated, the existence of loose scoria and related intravalley lava flows to the current topography indicates they formed in the last 2.5 million years of the Quaternary period.

The Thumb is largely made of columnar basalt bounded by pockets of breccia comprising clasts of the basal sandstone that formed during the Paleocene period.

The Thumb consists of alkali olivine basalt along with other Quaternary volcanic plugs in the Omineca Mountains. The basalt comprises phenocrysts of clinopyroxene and labradorite. Volcanic plugs in the Omineca Mountains, such as The Thumb, are located at the outermost boundary of all major volcanic belts in British Columbia, and their origins are not well-defined.

See also
 List of volcanoes in Canada
 List of Northern Cordilleran volcanoes
 Volcanism of Canada
 Volcanism of Western Canada
 Thumb Peak

References

Volcanic plugs of British Columbia
One-thousanders of British Columbia
Omineca Country
Great Divide of North America
Quaternary volcanoes
Omineca Mountains